411 squadron may refer to:

 No. 411 Squadron RCAF, Canada
 411th Aero Squadron, a United States aero squadron
 411th Bombardment Squadron, United States
 411th Flight Test Squadron, United States